Green Sky Adventures, Inc. is an American aircraft manufacturer based in Hawthorne, Florida. The company specializes in the design and manufacture of light aircraft in the form of plans and kits for amateur construction. It was established in 1984.

The company provides plans for the Green Sky Zippy Sport, a single seat strut-braced high wing aircraft, and kits for the Green Sky Adventures Micro Mong biplane design. The company also distributes the HKS 700E and the Rotax line of two-stroke and four-stroke aircraft engines, GSC Systems propellers and AeroLux Propellers.

Aircraft

References

External links

Aircraft manufacturers of the United States
Ultralight aircraft
Homebuilt aircraft
Manufacturing companies established in 1984
1984 establishments in Florida